Santa Rosa Island may refer to:

Santa Rosa Island (California), one of the Channel Islands
Santa Rosa Island (Florida)
Battle of Santa Rosa Island, a battle of the American Civil War